Luca Petri (born January 31, 1989, in Pisa) is an Italian professional footballer.

In January 2011 he joined Lecco on loan. Luca Bartoccini also left for Lucchese in exchange.

References

External links
 

1989 births
Living people
Italian footballers
Montevarchi Calcio Aquila 1902 players
S.S.D. Lucchese 1905 players
Calcio Lecco 1912 players
Association football defenders